The 2012–12 Wisconsin Badgers men's ice hockey season is the team's 59th season and their 53rd season as a member of the Western Collegiate Hockey Association. They represent the University of Wisconsin–Madison in the 2011–12 NCAA Division I men's ice hockey season. The team is coached by Mike Eaves, and they play their home games at Kohl Center.

Regular season
 On October 21 and 22 the Badgers swept North Dakota for the first time since 2006, the first time at the Kohl Center since 2004.
 On November 11 the Badgers beat #1 ranked Minnesota 3–1.

Standings

Schedule and results
  Green background indicates win (2 points).
  Red background indicates loss (0 points).
  White background indicates tie (1 point).

Awards and honors
 Joel Rumpel, WCHA Rookie of the Week (Week of October 25)

See also
 2011–12 Wisconsin Badgers women's ice hockey season

References

Wisconsin
Wisconsin Badgers men's ice hockey seasons
Wisconsin Badgers men's i
Wisconsin Badgers men's i